The 2021 Atlantic hurricane season was the third most active Atlantic hurricane season on record with 21 named storms, and the sixth consecutive year in which there was above-average tropical cyclone activity The season officially began on June 1, 2021, and ended on November 30, 2021. These dates, adopted by convention, historically describe the period in each year when most Northern Atlantic tropical cyclones form. However, tropical cyclone formation is possible at any time of the year, as was the case this season, when Tropical Storm Ana formed on May 22. The season's final system, Tropical Storm Wanda, dissipated on November 7. Of the season's 21 named storms, seven became hurricanes, and four further intensified into major hurricanes. The season's most devastating storm was Hurricane Ida. The storm caused an estimated $75 billion (2021 USD) in damages in the U.S. and it was responsible for 87 deaths. Over half of those deaths occurred in New York and New Jersey, as the hurricane's remnants brought rains that triggered widespread flooding throughout that region. Additionally, heavy rains caused widespread flooding and landslides across Venezuela as Ida's precursor tropical wave passed though the southeastern Caribbean Sea, resulting in at least 20 deaths. In April 2022, the name Ida was retired from reuse in the North Atlantic by the World Meteorological Organization due to the extraordinary amount of damage and number of fatalities it caused.

This timeline documents tropical cyclone formations, strengthening, weakening, landfalls, extratropical transitions, and dissipations during the season. It includes information that was not released throughout the season, meaning that data from post-storm reviews by the National Hurricane Center, such as a storm that was not initially warned upon, has been included.

By convention, meteorologists use one time zone when issuing forecasts and making observations: Coordinated Universal Time (UTC), and also use the 24-hour clock (where 00:00 = midnight UTC). The National Hurricane Center uses both UTC and the time zone where the center of the tropical cyclone is currently located. The time zones utilized (east to west) are: Greenwich, Cape Verde, Atlantic, Eastern, and Central. In this timeline, all information is listed by UTC first, with the respective regional time zone included in parentheses. Additionally, figures for maximum sustained winds and position estimates are rounded to the nearest 5 units (knots, miles, or kilometers), following National Hurricane Center practice. Direct wind observations are rounded to the nearest whole number. Atmospheric pressures are listed to the nearest millibar and nearest hundredth of an inch of mercury.

Timeline

May

May 22
 06:00 UTC (2:00 a.m. AST) at   Subtropical Storm Ana forms from an extratropical cyclone about 200 mi (325 km) northeast of Bermuda.

May 23
 00:00 UTC (8:00 p.m. AST, May 23) at   Subtropical Storm Ana transitions to a tropical storm about 235 mi (280 km) northeast of Bermuda.
18:00 UTC (2:00 p.m. AST) at   Tropical Storm Ana transitions to a post-tropical cyclone about 455 mi (730 km) northeast of Bermuda, and subsequently opens up into a trough.

June

June 1
 The 2021 Atlantic hurricane season officially begins.

June 14

June 15

June 16

June 19
 00:00 UTC (7:00 p.m.
 04:30 UTC (11:30 p.m.
 06:00 UTC (1:00 a.m.
 18:00 UTC (1:00 p.m.

June 21
 06:00 UTC (2:00 a.m. EDT) at   Tropical Depression Claudette re-strengthens into a tropical storm just off the North Carolina coast.

June 22
 06:00 UTC (2:00 a.m. AST) at   Tropical Storm Claudette transitions to an  extratropical low, and subsequently dissipates southeast of the coast of Nova Scotia.

June 27
 18:00 UTC (2:00 p.m.

June 28
 06:00 UTC (2:00 a.m.
 18:00 UTC (2:00 p.m.
 23:20 UTC (7:20 p.m.

June 29
 00:00 UTC (8:00 p.m. EDT, June 28) at   Tropical Storm Danny weakens into a tropical depression inland over eastern South Carolina, and later dissipates over eastern Georgia.

June 30
 18:00 UTC (2:00 p.m.

July 

July 1
 00:00 UTC (8:00 p.m.

July 2
 12:00 UTC (8:00 a.m.
 18:00 UTC (2:00 p.m.

July 3
 12:00 UTC (8:00 a.m.

July 5
 18:00 UTC (2:00 p.m.

July 7
00:00 UTC (8:00 p.m.
06:00 UTC (2:00 a.m.
14:30 UTC (10:30 a.m.

July 9
15:00 UTC (11:00 a.m.
16:30 UTC (12:30 p.m.
18:00 UTC (2:00 p.m. EDT) at   Tropical Storm Elsa transitions into an extratropical cyclone over southeastern New England, and later dissipates.

August 

August 11
00:00 UTC (8:00 p.m.
17:00 UTC (1:00 p.m.

August 12
00:00 UTC (8:00 p.m.

August 13
00:00 UTC (8:00 p.m.
06:00 UTC (2:00 p.m.
12:00 UTC (8:00 a.m. EDT) at   Tropical Storm Fred again weakens into a tropical depression as it simultaneously makes landfall on Cayo Romano, on the northern coast of Cuba.

August 14
00:00 UTC (8:00 a.m. EDT, August 13) at   Tropical Depression Fred degenerates into an open trough over central Cuba.
12:00 UTC (8:00 a.m.

August 15
00:00 UTC (8:00 p.m.
12:00 UTC (8:00 a.m.
18:00 UTC (2:00 p.m.
 
August 16
12:00 UTC (8:00 a.m.
16:30 UTC (12:30 p.m.
18:00 UTC (1:00 p.m.
18:00 UTC (2:00 p.m.
19:00 UTC (2:00 p.m. CDT) at   Tropical Storm Fred makes landfall at peak intensity on the St. Joseph Peninsula, just northwest of Cape San Blas, in the Florida Panhandle.

August 17
12:00 UTC (8:00 a.m. EDT) at   Tropical Storm Fred weakens to a tropical depression over eastern Alabama.
14:00 UTC (10:00 a.m.

August 18
00:00 UTC (8:00 p.m. EDT, August 17) at   Tropical Storm Fred becomes a post-tropical low over eastern Tennessee.
12:00 UTC (8:00 a.m.

August 19
00:00 UTC (8:00 p.m. EDT, August 18) at   Post-Tropical Cyclone Fred becomes an extratropical low over central Pennsylvania, and subsequently dissipates.
09:45 UTC (4:45 a.m.
12:00 UTC (7:00 a.m. CDT) at   Hurricane Grace weakens into a tropical storm inland over the Yucatán Peninsula.

August 20
12:00 UTC (7:00 a.m.
18:00 UTC (1:00 p.m.

August 21
00:00 UTC (7:00 p.m.
05:30 UTC (12:30 a.m. CDT) at   Hurricane Grace makes landfall near Tecolutla, Veracruz, at peak intensity.
12:00 UTC (7:00 a.m.
12:00 UTC (8:00 a.m.

August 22
06:00 UTC (2:00 a.m.
12:00 UTC (8:00 a.m.
15:20 UTC (11:20 a.m.
16:15 UTC (12:15 p.m.

August 23
00:00 UTC (8:00 p.m.
18:00 UTC (2:00 p.m.

August 26
15:00 UTC (11:00 a.m.
18:00 UTC (6:00 p.m.

August 27
 18:00 UTC (2:00 p.m. EDT) at   Tropical Storm Ida strengthens into a Category 1 hurricane as it makes landfall on Isla de la Juventud, Cuba.
 23:25 UTC (7:25 p.m.

August 28
 06:00 UTC (2:00 a.m.
18:00 UTC (2:00 p.m.

August 29
00:00 UTC (7:00 p.m.
06:00 UTC (1:00 a.m.
06:00 UTC (2:00 a.m.
12:00 UTC (7:00 a.m.
16:55 UTC (11:55 a.m.

August 30
00:00 UTC (7:00 p.m.
06:00 UTC (1:00 a.m. CDT) at   Hurricane Ida weakens to Category 1 strength about 20 mi (30 km) south-southwest of Greensburg, Louisiana.
06:00 UTC (6:00 a.m.
06:00 UTC (2:00 a.m. AST) at   Tropical Depression Ten strengthens into Tropical Storm Kate.
12:00 UTC (7:00 a.m.
12:00 UTC (12:00 a.m.
12:00 UTC (8:00 a.m.

August 31
00:00 UTC (7:00 p.m.
12:00 UTC (8:00 a.m. AST) at   Tropical Storm Kate weakens into a tropical depression.
18:00 UTC (5:00 p.m.

September 

September 1
00:00 UTC (11:00 p.m.
12:00 UTC (8:00 a.m. EDT) at   Tropical Depression Ida transitions into an extratropical low over southern West Virginia, and subsequently degenerates to a trough.
12:00 UTC (8:00 a.m.

September 2
06:00 UTC (2:00 a.m.

September 3
18:00 UTC (2:00 p.m.

September 4
00:00 UTC (8:00 p.m.

September 5
12:00 UTC (8:00 a.m.

September 7
12:00 UTC (8:00 a.m.

September 8
18:00 UTC (1:00 p.m.

September 9
01:15 UTC (8:15 p.m.
06:00 UTC (2:00 a.m.
12:00 UTC (8:00 a.m. EDT) at   Tropical Storm Mindy weakens into a tropical depression over southeast Georgia.

September 10
00:00 UTC (8:00 p.m.

September 11
03:30 UTC (11:30 p.m.
12:00 UTC (8:00 a.m.

September 12
12:00 UTC (7:00 a.m.

September 14
00:00 UTC (7:00 p.m.
05:30 UTC (12:30 a.m.
12:00 UTC (7:00 a.m.

September 15
00:00 UTC (7:00 p.m.
18:00 UTC (1:00 p.m.

September 17
18:00 UTC (2:00 p.m.

September 18
06:00 UTC (2:00 a.m.
12:00 UTC (8:00 a.m.

September 19
00:00 UTC (8:00 p.m.
00:00 UTC (11:00 p.m.
06:00 UTC (2:00 a.m.
18:00 UTC (2:00 p.m.
18:00 UTC (5:00 p.m.

September 21
00:00 UTC (8:00 p.m.
18:00 UTC (2:00 p.m.

September 22
06:00 UTC (2:00 a.m.
12:00 UTC (8:00 a.m.
18:00 UTC (2:00 p.m.

September 23
06:00 UTC (2:00 a.m. AST) at   Tropical Depression Eighteen strengthens into Tropical Storm Sam.

September 24
06:00 UTC (2:00 a.m.
06:00 UTC (2:00 a.m.
12:00 UTC (8:00 a.m. AST) at   The subtropical depression strengthens into Subtropical Storm Teresa about 110 mi (175 km) east of Bermuda.
18:00 UTC (2:00 p.m.

September 25
00:00 UTC (8:00 p.m. AST, September 24) at   Hurricane Sam intensifies to Category 2 strength.
12:00 UTC (8:00 a.m. AST) at   Hurricane Sam intensifies to Category 3 strength.
12:00 UTC (8:00 a.m. AST) at   Subtropical Storm Teresa weakens into a subtropical depression about 135 mi (220 km) north of Bermuda.
18:00 UTC (2:00 p.m. AST) at   Hurricane Sam intensifies to Category 4 strength.
18:00 UTC (2:00 p.m. AST) at   Subtropical Depression Teresa degenerates into a remnant low about 135 mi (215 km) north of Bermuda, and subsequently dissipates.

September 26
18:00 UTC (2:00 p.m.

September 27
12:00 UTC (8:00 a.m. AST) at   Hurricane Sam weakens to Category 3 strength.

September 28
06:00 UTC (2:00 a.m. AST) at   Hurricane Sam re-intensifies to Category 4 strength.

September 29
12:00 UTC (11:00 a.m.
18:00 UTC (5:00 p.m. CVT) at   Tropical Depression Twenty strengthens into Tropical Storm Victor south of the Cabo Verde Islands.

October 

October 1
06:00 UTC (2:00 a.m.
12:00 UTC (8:00 a.m.

October 2
18:00 UTC (2:00 p.m.
18:00 UTC (2:00 p.m.

October 3
06:00 UTC (2:00 a.m.

October 4
12:00 UTC (8:00 a.m.
18:00 UTC (6:00 p.m.

October 5
06:00 UTC (6:00 a.m.

October 30
12:00 UTC (8:00 a.m.

October 31
12:00 UTC (12:00 p.m.

November 

November 1
12:00 UTC (12:00 p.m.

November 7
12:00 UTC (12:00 p.m.

November 30
 The 2021 Atlantic hurricane season officially ends.

See also

 Lists of Atlantic hurricanes
 Timeline of the 2021 Pacific hurricane season

Notes

References

External links 

 2021 Tropical Cyclone Advisory Archive, National Hurricane Center and Central Pacific Hurricane Center, noaa.gov

2021
2021
Articles which contain graphical timelines